Călin Peter Netzer (born 1 May 1975) is a Romanian film director who won the Golden Bear at the 63rd Berlin International Film Festival.

Born in Petroșani to a family of Romanian and German origins, Netzer emigrated with his family to West Germany in 1983. In 1994, he returned to Romania in order to study film direction at the Academy of Theatre and Film in Bucharest.

His first feature film, Maria (2003), won the Special Prize of the Jury at the Locarno International Film Festival, among other prizes at this and other film festivals.

Poziția copilului (Child's Pose, 2013), his third feature film, won him the Golden Bear at the 63rd Berlin International Film Festival. The film was selected as the Romanian entry for the Best Foreign Language Film at the 86th Academy Awards.

Selected filmography

References

External links

1975 births
Living people
People from Petroșani
Romanian emigrants to Germany
Romanian film directors
Romanian screenwriters
Directors of Golden Bear winners
Caragiale National University of Theatre and Film alumni